Peculiar Lives is the seventh in the series of Time Hunter novellas and features the characters Honoré Lechasseur and Emily Blandish from Daniel O'Mahony's Doctor Who novella The Cabinet of Light. It is written by Philip Purser-Hallard, author of the Mad Norwegian Press Faction Paradox novel Of the City of the Saved...

The novella is also available in a limited edition hardback, signed by the author.

(The series is not formally connected to the Whoniverse.)

Themes
Peculiar Lives is written as if by Erik Clevedon, who is based on the real-life author Olaf Stapledon. The story draws particularly from Stapledon's novels Last and First Men (1930), Last Men in London (1932), Odd John (1935) and Sirius (1944). The book also features the characters of Gideon Beech, a fictionalised George Bernard Shaw, and (briefly) John Cleavis, a fictionalised C. S. Lewis character originally created by Paul Magrs. Purser-Hallard studied Stapledon's, Shaw's and Lewis' work in his doctoral thesis, and draws on them for the key themes of Peculiar Lives. These concern eugenics and the evolution of mankind within an eschatological context.

Synopsis
Honoré Lechasseur and Emily Blandish become embroiled in the endgame of a plot which began a generation ago, with the birth of the superhuman children known as "the Peculiar".  While Emily encounters their chronicler, the elderly science-fiction novelist Erik Clevedon, Honoré is pitched against his will into an unimaginably distant future.

Literary References
John Cleavis first appeared in Paul Magrs' Doctor Who novel Mad Dogs and Englishmen (2002) and then in the standalone To the Devil — a Diva! (2004). He is included in Peculiar Lives with Magrs' permission. Peculiar Lives also name-checks J. D. Beresford's The Hampdenshire Wonder (1911).

Audiobook
Peculiar Lives was released as an audiobook in November 2011, read by John Leeson and published by Fantom Films.

External links
 Telos Publishing - Peculiar Lives
 Author's pages about the book (including essays on the literary contexts of the novella and some additional material)
 Fantom Films - Peculiar Lives audiobook

Time Hunter
2005 British novels
Novels by Philip Purser-Hallard
British science fiction novels